The 1990 Pacific hurricane season saw a then-record 16 hurricanes form. Throughout the year, 21 tropical cyclones became named storms in the eastern Pacific Ocean. Hurricane Alma formed on May 12, 1990, three days before the season's official start on May 15. The Central Pacific hurricane season began on June 1, covering tropical cyclone formation in the region between 140°W and International Dateline. Hurricane Trudy was the last storm to dissipate, doing so on November 1, nearly a month before the Pacific hurricane season officially ended on November 30.

The season produced twenty-seven tropical depressions, of which twenty-one became named storms, and sixteen strengthened into hurricanes. Six out of the sixteen hurricanes strengthened into major hurricanes. Despite high levels of activity, Rachel was the only system to make landfall, bringing floods to Northwestern Mexico and the Southwestern United States. Thousands were left homeless, and there were 18 confirmed fatalities. Additionally, the remnants of Hurricane Boris brought light showers to California. At that time, Hurricane Hernan was the strongest Pacific hurricane to have its intensity estimated via satellite imagery; this record was matched by Hurricane Trudy months later. One tropical storm formed in the Central Pacific Hurricane Center's warning zone and eventually crossed the International Dateline before dissipating.

This timeline includes information that was not operationally released, meaning that data from post-storm reviews by the National Hurricane Center, such as a storm that was not operationally warned upon, has been included. This timeline documents tropical cyclone formations, strengthening, weakening, landfalls, and dissipations during the season.

Timeline

May

May 12
1800 UTC (11 a.m.
May 13
1800 UTC (11 a.m. PDT) – Tropical Depression One-E strengthens into Tropical Storm Alma, becoming an off-season tropical cyclone.
May 15
The 1990 Pacific hurricane season officially begins.
1200 UTC (5 a.m. PDT) – Tropical Storm Alma strengthens into a Category 1 hurricane.
May 16
0600 UTC (11 p.m.
1800 UTC (11 a.m. PDT) – Hurricane Alma weakens to a tropical storm.
May 17
1800 UTC (11 a.m. PDT) – Tropical Storm Alma weakens to a tropical depression.
May 18
1800 UTC (11 a.m. PDT) – Tropical Depression Alma dissipates while centered about 1,445 mi (2,325 km) southwest of San Diego, California.

June
June 1
The 1990 Central Pacific hurricane season officially begins.
June 2
1800 UTC (11 a.m. PDT) – Tropical Depression Two-E develops from a tropical wave while located about 430 mi (690 km) south of Acapulco, Guerrero.
June 4
0000 UTC (5 p.m. PDT June 3) – The depression strengthens into Tropical Storm Boris.
June 5
0000 UTC (5 p.m. PDT June 4) – Tropical Storm Boris strengthens into a Category 1 hurricane.
1200 UTC (5 a.m.
June 6
1200 UTC (5 a.m. PDT) – Hurricane Boris weakens back into a tropical storm.

June 7
0600 UTC (11 p.m. PDT June 6) – The NHC downgrades Tropical Storm Boris into a tropical depression.
June 8
1200U UTC (5 a.m.
1800 UTC (11 a.m.
June 9
1200 UTC (5 a.m. PDT) – The tropical depression intensifies into Tropical Storm Cristina.
June 12
1200 UTC (5 a.m.
June 14
0000 UTC (5 p.m. PDT June 13) – Tropical Storm Cristina weakens to a tropical depression.
1200 UTC (5 a.m.
June 19
0000 UTC (5 p.m.
1800 UTC (11 a.m. PDT) – Tropical Depression Four strengthens into Tropical Storm Douglas.
June 21
1200 UTC (5 a.m.
June 23
1200 UTC (5 a.m. PDT) – Tropical Storm Douglas weakens to a tropical depression.
June 24
0000 UTC (5 p.m.

June 26
0600 UTC (11 p.m.
1800 UTC (11 a.m. PDT) – Tropical Depression Five-E strengthens into Tropical Storm Elida.
June 28
0000 UTC (5 p.m. PDT June 27) – Tropical Storm Elida becomes a Category 1 hurricane.
0600 UTC (11 p.m. Simultaneously, Elida crosses over Socorro Island.
June 29
1200 UTC (5 a.m. PDT) – Hurricane Elida weakens to a tropical storm.
1800 UTC (11 a.m.

July
July 1
0000 UTC (5 p.m. PDT June 30) – Tropical Storm Elida weakens into a tropical depression.
July 2
1800 UTC (11 a.m. PDT) – Tropical Depression Elida dissipates about 945 mi (1,520 km) southwest of Guadalupe Island.
July 3
1800 UTC (11 a.m.
July 6
0000 UTC (5 p.m.
July 7
0000 UTC (5 p.m. PDT July 6) – Tropical Depression Seven-E strengthens into Tropical Storm Fausto.

July 8
1200 UTC (5 a.m. PDT) – The NHC upgrades Tropical Storm Fausto into a Category 1 hurricane.
July 9
0000 UTC (5 p.m.
July 10
0000 UTC (5 p.m.
0600 UTC (11 p.m.
1800 UTC (11 a.m. PDT) – Hurricane Fausto weakens to a tropical storm.
July 11
1800 UTC (11 a.m. PDT) – Tropical Storm Fausto degenerates into a tropical depression.
1800 UTC (11 a.m. PDT) – Tropical Depression Eight-E strengthens into Tropical Storm Genevieve.

July 13
0000 UTC (5 p.m.
0000 UTC (5 p.m. PDT July 12) – Tropical Storm Genevieve strengthens into a Category 1 hurricane.
July 15
0000 UTC (5p.m. PDT July 14) – Hurricane Genevieve is upgraded into a Category 2 hurricane.
July 16
0600 UTC (11p.m. PDT July 15) – Hurricane Genevieve weakens back to a Category 1 hurricane.
July 17
0000 UTC (5p.m. PDT July 16) – Hurricane Genevieve degenerates into a tropical storm.
July 18
0000 UTC (5p.m. PDT July 17) – Tropical Storm Genevieve weakens to a tropical depression.
July 19
July 20
1200 UTC (5a.m. PDT) – Tropical Depression Ten-E forms from a tropical wave while located about 395 mi (635 km) south of Puerto Ángel, Oaxaca.

July 21
0000 UTC (5 p.m. PDT July 20) – Tropical Depression Nine-E strengthens into Tropical Storm Hernan.
1200 UTC (5 a.m. PDT) – Tropical Depression Ten-E strengthens into Tropical Storm Iselle.
1800 UTC (11 a.m. PDT) – Tropical Storm Hernan strengthens into a Category 1 hurricane.
July 22
0600 UTC (11 p.m. PDT July 21) – Hurricane Hernan is upgraded into a Category 2 hurricane.
1200 UTC (5 a.m. PDT) – Hurricane Hernan intensifies into a Category 3 hurricane.
1800 UTC (11 a.m. PDT) – Hurricane Hernan strengthens into a Category 4 hurricane.
1800 UTC (11 a.m. PDT) – Tropical Storm Iselle intensifies into a Category 1 hurricane.
July 23
1800 UTC (11 a.m.
1800 UTC (11 a.m. PDT) – Hurricane Iselle strengthens into a Category 2 hurricane.

July 24
0000 UTC (5 p.m. PDT July 23) – Tropical Depression Eleven-E develops about 1445 mi (2,325 km) west-southwest of the southern tip of the Baja California Peninsula.
1200 UTC (5 a.m. PDT) – Hurricane Iselle strengthens into a Category 3 hurricane.
July 25
0600 UTC (11 p.m. PDT July 24) – Hurricane Hernan weakens to a Category 3 hurricane.
1200 UTC (5 a.m.
July 26
1800 UTC (11a.m. PDT) – Hurricane Hernan weakens into a Category 2 hurricane.
July 27
0000 UTC (5p.m. PDT July 26) – Hurricane Hernan weakens back to a Category 1 hurricane.
July 28
0000 UTC (5p.m. PDT July 27) – Hurricane Hernan weakens to a tropical storm.
July 30
0000 UTC (5p.m. PDT July 29) – Tropical Storm Hernan weakens to a tropical depression.
July 31
0600 UTC (11p.m. PDT July 30) – Tropical Depression Hernan dissipates midway between Honolulu, Hawaii and Guadalupe Island.

August
August 7
1800 UTC (9 a.m. HST) – Tropical Depression One-C develops from an area of disturbed weather while located about 695 mi (1,120 km) south-southeast of Ka Lae, Hawaii.
August 8
0000 UTC (3 p.m. HST August 7) – Tropical Depression One-C strengthens into Tropical Storm Aka.
1200 UTC (3 a.m. HST) – Tropical Storm Aka attains its peak intensity with maximum sustained winds of 65 mph (100 km/h), though the minimum pressure is unknown.
August 10
1800 UTC (9 a.m. HST) – Tropical Depression Two-C develops from a tropical disturbance while located about 1,030 mi (1,660 km) east-southeast of Hilo.

August 13
0000 UTC (3 p.m.
0600 UTC (9 p.m. HST August 12) – Tropical Storm Aka crossed the International Dateline.
August 16
1200 UTC (5 a.m. PDT) – Tropical Depression Twelve-E forms about 155 mi (250 km) west-northwest of Clipperton Island.
August 17
0000 UTC (5 p.m.
August 18
1200 UTC (5 a.m. PDT) – Tropical Depression Thirteen-E strengthens into Tropical Storm Julio.
August 19
1200 UTC (5 a.m. PDT) – The NHC upgrades Tropical Storm Julio into a Category 1 hurricane.
1200 UTC (5 a.m.
August 20
1200 UTC (5 a.m. PDT) – Hurricane Julio strengthens into a Category 2 hurricane.

August 21
0600 UTC (11 p.m. PDT August 20) – Hurricane Julio is upgraded into a Category 3 hurricane.
1200 UTC (5 a.m.
1800 UTC (11 a.m.
August 22
0600 UTC (11 p.m. PDT August 21) – Hurricane Julio weakens to a Category 2 hurricane.
0600 UTC (11 p.m. PDT August 21) – Tropical Depression Fourteen-E strengthens into Tropical Storm Kenna.
1200 UTC (5 a.m. PDT) – Hurricane Julio weakens to a Category 1 hurricane.
August 23
0000 UTC (5 p.m. PDT August 22) – Hurricane Julio weakens to a tropical storm.
1800 UTC (11 a.m.
August 24
0600 UTC (11 p.m. PDT August 23) – Tropical Storm Julio weakens to a tropical depression.
1800 UTC (11 a.m.
August 25
0000 UTC (5 p.m. PDT August 24) – Tropical Storm Kenna intensifies into a Category 1 hurricane.
1800 UTC (11 a.m. PDT) – Tropical Depression Fifteen-E strengthens into Tropical Storm Lowell.

August 26
0000 UTC (5 p.m.
August 27
0600 UTC (11 p.m. PDT August 26) – Tropical Storm Lowell strengthens into a Category 1 hurricane.
August 28
0000 UTC (5 p.m. PDT August 27) – Hurricane Kenna weakens to a tropical storm.
0000 UTC (5 p.m.
1800 UTC (11 a.m. PDT) – Hurricane Lowell weakens to a tropical storm.
August 29
0600 UTC (11 p.m. PDT August 28) – Tropical Storm Kenna weakens to a tropical depression.
August 30
1800 UTC (11 a.m. PDT) – Tropical Depression Kenna dissipates about 1,125 mi (1,810 km) east of Hilo.
August 31
1200 UTC (5 a.m. PDT) – Tropical Storm Lowell weakens to a tropical depression.

September
September 1
1800 UTC (11 a.m. PDT) – Tropical Depression Lowell dissipates about 1,230 mi (1,980 km) east of Hilo.
September 7
1200 UTC (5 a.m.
September 8
1200 UTC (5 a.m. PDT) – Tropical Depression Sixteen-E strengthens into Tropical Storm Marie.
September 9
0600 UTC (11 p.m. PDT September 8) – Tropical Storm Marie is upgraded into a Category 1 hurricane.
1800 UTC (11 a.m. PDT) – Tropical Depression Eighteen-E forms about 225 mi (360 km) southwest of Acapulco.
September 10
0000 UTC (5 p.m. PDT September 9) – Hurricane Marie strengthens into a Category 2 hurricane.
0000 UTC (5 p.m. PDT September 9) – Tropical Depression Seventeen-E develops from a tropical wave while located about 455 mi (730 km) south-southwest of Socorro Island.
1200 UTC (5 a.m. PDT) – Hurricane Marie strengthens into a Category 3 hurricane.
1800 UTC (11 a.m. PDT) – Tropical Depression Seventeen-E strengthens into Tropical Storm Norbert.

September 11
0000 UTC (5 p.m. PDT September 10) – Hurricane Marie strengthens into a Category 4 hurricane.
0300 UTC (8 p.m.
September 12
0000 UTC (5 p.m. PDT September 11) – Hurricane Marie weakens to a Category 3 hurricane.
1200 UTC (5 a.m.PDT) – Hurricane Marie weakens to a Category 2 hurricane.
1800 UTC (11 a.m. PDT) – Tropical Depression Eighteen-E dissipates about 30 mi (50 km) northwest of Clarion Island.
September 13
1800 UTC (11 a.m. PDT) – Hurricane Marie regains Category 3 hurricane strength.
September 14
0000 UTC (5 p.m. PDT September 13) – Tropical Storm Norbert strengthens into a Category 1 hurricane.
1200 UTC (3 a.m. HST) – Hurricane Marie moves into the Central Pacific Hurricane Center's area of responsibility.
September 15
0600 UTC (11 p.m.
1800 UTC (11 a.m. PDT) – Hurricane Norbert weakens to a tropical storm.
September 16
1800 UTC (9 a.m. HST) – Hurricane Marie rapidly weakens into a Category 1 hurricane.
September 17
0600 UTC (9 p.m. HST September 16) – Hurricane Marie weakens back to tropical storm status.
September 18
0600 UTC (11 p.m. PDT September 17) – Tropical Storm Norbert weakens to a tropical depression.
September 19
0000 UTC (3 p.m. HST September 18) – Tropical Storm Marie weakens to a tropical depression.
1800 UTC (11 a.m.
September 21
September 23
1200 UTC (5a.m. PDT) – Tropical Depression Nineteen-E develops from an area of disturbed weather while located approximately 565 mi (910 km) south-southeast of Socorro Island.
September 24
0600 UTC (11p.m. PDT September 23) – Tropical Depression Nineteen-E strengthens into Tropical Storm Odile.
September 25
1200 UTC (5a.m. PDT) – Tropical Storm Odile intensifies into a Category 1 hurricane.
1800 UTC (11a.m. PDT) – Hurricane Odile strengthens into a Category 2 hurricane.

September 26
0600 UTC (11p.m. PDT September 25) – Hurricane Odile strengthens into a Category 3 hurricane.
1200 UTC (5a.m. PDT) – Hurricane Odile strengthens into a Category 4 hurricane.
September 27
0000 UTC (5p.m. PDT September 26) – Tropical Depression Twenty-E develops from a tropical wave while centered about 235 mi (380 km) south of Acapulco.
September 28
0000 UTC (5 p.m. PDT September 27) – Hurricane Odile weakens to a Category 3 hurricane.
0600 UTC (11 p.m. PDT September 27) – Hurricane Odile weakens to a Category 2 hurricane.
1800 UTC (11 a.m. PDT) – Hurricane Odile weakens to a Category 1 hurricane.
2100 UTC (2 p.m. PDT) – Tropical Depression Twenty-E develops from a tropical wave located about east of  Hilo, Hawaii.
September 29
0600 UTC (11 p.m. PDT September 28) – Hurricane Odile weakens to a tropical storm.
1800 UTC (11 a.m. PDT) – Tropical Depression Twenty-E strengthens into Tropical Storm Polo.
September 30
0600 UTC (11 p.m. PDT September 29) – Tropical Storm Odile weakens back to a tropical depression.
0600 UTC (11 p.m. PDT September 29) – Tropical Storm Polo strengthens into a Category 1 hurricane.
0600 UTC (11 p.m. PDT September 29) – Tropical Depression Twenty One-E strengthens into Tropical Storm Rachel.
1800 UTC (11 a.m. PDT) – Hurricane Polo weakens to a tropical storm.

October
October 1
0000 UTC (3 p.m. HST September 30) – Tropical Storm Polo enters the Central Pacific Hurricane Center's area of responsibility.
1200 UTC (3 a.m. HST) – Tropical Storm Polo weakens to a tropical depression.
1800 UTC (9 a.m.
October 2
0600 UTC (11 p.m.
0600 UTC (11 p.m.
1200 UTC (5 a.m. PDT) – Tropical Storm Rachel moves over the southern tip of Baja California Sur with winds of 65 mph (100 km/h).
1900 UTC (12 p.m. PDT) – Tropical Storm Rachel makes another landfall roughly midway between Los Mochis and Culiacán, Sinaloa with winds of 60 mph (90 km/h).

October 3
0000 UTC (5 p.m. PDT October 2) – Now over land, Tropical Storm Rachel is downgraded a tropical depression.
0600 UTC (11 p.m. PDT October 2) – Tropical Depression Rachel dissipates over Chihuahua.
October 9
October 10
0000 UTC (5 p.m. PDT October 9) – Tropical Depression Twenty Two-E becomes Tropical Storm Simon.
October 11
1800 UTC (11 a.m.
October 13
1800 UTC (11 a.m. PDT) – Tropical Storm Simon weakens into a tropical depression.
October 15
0000 UTC (5 p.m. PDT October 14) – Tropical Depression Simon dissipates about 1,195 mi (1,925 km) southwest of Los Angeles, California.
October 16
0000 UTC (5p.m. PDT October 15) – Tropical Depression Twenty Three-E formers from a tropical wave while located about 455 mi (730 km) south of Acapulco.
October 17
1200 UTC (5a.m. PDT) – Tropical Depression Twenty Three-E strengthens into Tropical Storm Trudy.
October 18
1200 UTC (5a.m. PDT) – Tropical Storm Trudy strengthens into a Category 1 hurricane.
October 19
0000 UTC (5p.m. PDT October 18) – Hurricane Trudy strengthens into a Category 2 hurricane.
0600 UTC (11p.m. PDT October 18) – Hurricane Trudy strengthens into a Category 3 hurricane.
1800 UTC (11a.m. PDT) – Hurricane Trudy strengthens into a Category 4 hurricane.

October 20
1200 UTC (5a.m. PDT) – Hurricane Trudy attains its peak intensity with winds of 155 mph (250 km/h).
October 21
1200 UTC (5a.m. PDT) – Hurricane Trudy weakens back to a Category 3 hurricane.
October 22
0000 UTC (5p.m. PDT October 21) – Hurricane Trudy weakens to a Category 2 hurricane.
1800 UTC (11a.m. PDT) – Hurricane Trudy weakens to a Category 1 hurricane.
October 23
0000 UTC (5p.m. PDT October 22) – Tropical Depression Twenty Four-E strengthens into Tropical Storm Vance.
October 25
0000 UTC (5p.m. PDT October 24) – Hurricane Trudy re-strengthens into a Category 2 hurricane.
1200 UTC (5a.m. PDT) – The NHC upgrades Hurricane Trudy into a Category 3 hurricane for a second time.
1200 UTC (5a.m. PDT) – Tropical Storm Vance strengthens into a Category 1 hurricane.
October 26
0000 UTC (5p.m. PDT October 25) – Hurricane Vance intensifies into a Category 2 hurricane and attains its peak intensity with winds of 100 mph (155 km/h).
0600 UTC (11p.m. PDT October 25) – Hurricane Trudy re-strengthens into a Category 4 hurricane.

October 27
0000 UTC (5p.m. PDT October 26) – Hurricane Vance weakens to a Category 1 hurricane.
1800 UTC (11a.m. PDT) – Hurricane Trudy weakens to a Category 3 hurricane.
1800 UTC (11a.m. PDT) – Hurricane Vance weakens to a tropical storm.
October 28
1200 UTC (5a.m. PDT) – The NHC reports that Hurricane Trudy has weakened to a Category 2 hurricane.
October 29
0000 UTC (5p.m. PDT October 28) – Hurricane Trudy weakens to a Category 1 hurricane.
1800 UTC (11a.m. PDT) – Hurricane Trudy weakens to a tropical storm.
October 30
0600 UTC (11p.m. PDT October 29) – Tropical Storm Vance weakens back into a tropical depression.
October 31
1200 UTC (5a.m. PDT) – Tropical Storm Trudy weakens to a tropical depression.

November
November 1
0000 UTC (5 p.m.
1800 UTC (11 a.m.
November 30
2359 UTC (4:59 p.m. PDT) – The 1990 Pacific hurricane season officially ends.

See also
Pacific hurricane season
Timeline of the 1990 Atlantic hurricane season
Timeline of the 1990–91 South Pacific cyclone season

Notes

References

Pacific hurricane meteorological timelines
Articles which contain graphical timelines